Andrii Trusov (born 7 April 2000) is a Ukrainian Paralympic swimmer. He represented the Ukraine at the 2020 Summer Paralympics.

Career
Trusov represented Ukraine at the 2020 Summer Paralympics winning gold in the 50 metre freestyle S7 and 100 metre backstroke S7 events, and winning silver medals in the 400 metre freestyle S7 and 50 metre butterfly S7 events.

References

2000 births
Living people
Ukrainian male freestyle swimmers
Medalists at the World Para Swimming European Championships
Medalists at the World Para Swimming Championships
Paralympic swimmers of Ukraine
Paralympic medalists in swimming
Paralympic gold medalists for Ukraine
Paralympic silver medalists for Ukraine
Paralympic bronze medalists for Ukraine
Swimmers at the 2020 Summer Paralympics
Medalists at the 2020 Summer Paralympics
S7-classified Paralympic swimmers
21st-century Ukrainian people